The 2015–16 World Rugby Women's Sevens Series was the fourth edition of the World Rugby Women's Sevens Series (formerly the IRB Women's Sevens World Series), an annual series of tournaments organised by World Rugby for women's national teams in rugby sevens. The tour was a companion to the 2015–16 World Rugby Sevens Series for men.

The series was won by  who won three tour events on their way to claiming their first World Series title.

The competition
There were five tournament events in 2015–16. Twelve teams competed at each event; eleven being "core" teams, with a twelfth team invited to participate in particular events (similar to previous women's series as well as the men's counterpart). The overall winner of the series was determined by points gained from the standings across the five events.

For the second time, the women's series held a core team qualifying tournament, similar to that held in the men's HSBC Sevens World Series. The qualifying event was held at University College Dublin, in Ireland, and resulted in Japan and hosts Ireland qualifying as core teams for the main 2015-16 tournament.

Teams
Eleven "core teams" participated in all series events for the 2015–16 series, the same number as the previous season. The top nine finishers in the 2014–15 series were granted core team status for 2014–15:

 
 
 
 
 

 
 
 
 

Two additional core teams were determined in a qualifying tournament:

Events

Qualifying tournament 
The core team qualifying tournament was held at the UCD Bowl on 22–23 August 2015.

The qualifier began with a single round-robin pool stage, with teams divided into three four-team pools. The top two teams from each pool, plus the top two third-place finishers, advanced to a knockout stage. The two finalists (the semifinal winners) qualified as core teams for 2015–16.

  (qualified)
  (qualified)

Points schedule
The season championship is determined by points earned in each tournament. The scoring system is the same used in the previous year's series.

Cup winner (1st place): 20 points
Cup runner-up (2nd place): 18 points
Cup third-place play-off winner (3rd place): 16 points
Cup semi-finalist (4th place): 14 points
Plate winner (5th place): 12 points
Plate runner-up (6th place): 10 points
Plate third-place play-off winner (7th place): 8 points
Plate semi-finalist (8th place): 6 points
Bowl winner (9th place): 4 points
Bowl runner-up (10th place): 3 points
Bowl third-place play-off winner (11th place): 2 points
Bowl semi-finalist (12th place): 1 point

In the event of a tournament being abandoned, no series points are allocated.

If two or more teams are level on series points at the end of the season, the following tiebreakers are used to determine placement:
Overall difference in points scored and allowed during the season.
Total try count during the season.
If neither of the above produces a winner, the teams are considered tied.

Source: World Rugby

Table
Final standings for the 2015–16 series:

Source: World Rugby

{| class="wikitable" style="font-size:92%;"
|-
!style="border-right:0px;" width:15px;"| 
!style="border-left:0px;"| Legend
|- 
|bgcolor=ccffcc|
|Qualified as a core team for women's rugby sevens World Series V
|-
|
|Did not directly qualify for women's rugby sevens World Series V
|}

Tournaments

Dubai

Brazil

United States

Canada

France

References

 
2015
2016 rugby sevens competitions
2015 rugby sevens competitions
2016 in women's rugby union
2015 in women's rugby union